Outernet London is the name of a new type of entertainment district recently opened in the West End of London. It is the largest digital exhibition space in Europe with the "World's largest LED screen deployment". It is located in central London, adjacent to the new Elizabeth line Tottenham Court Road Underground station, on the southern side of the public square and extends to Denmark Street - “Tin Pan Alley” with St Giles High Street to the east and Charing Cross Road to the west

Spaces/Venues 
The district contains

 The Now Building - featuring four storey high video screens 
 Now Trending - a space for immersive content or sampling 
 Now Arcade - an LED tunnel 
 Here at Outernet - an underground 2,000 capacity music venue 
 The Lower Third - a 250 capacity music venue 
 Denmark Street - famous street with music related retail 
 Chateau Denmark - a hotel 

as well as broadcasting and media facilities, bars and restaurants and pop up spaces. 

Public spaces will reportedly feature a public arts programme and advertising campaigns using virtual reality, augmented reality  and artificial intelligence. News reports have indicated that entertainment will be created by Technicolor and Sir Ridley's Scott's the Ridley Scott Creative Group. 

There are also residential apartments, office space, and 20,000 sq ft of retail space.

Planning and Construction 
Construction follows more than a decade of planning. The main construction contractor for the project was Skanska and the developer is Consolidated Developments. To protect against vibration from the Elizabeth and Northern line tunnels special construction methods were used.

The area immediately surrounding Outernet was also recently under development from Crossrail and other projects such as the new @sohoplace theatre which both also opened in 2022. The Oxford Street shopping area has therefore undergone significant renewal.

Reaction and Comment 
The redevelopment has been welcomed by London's Night Czar Amy Lame, but has also been controversial and criticised with many commentators lamenting the decline of live music in London   and criticising the redevelopment plans, in particular their impact on Denmark Street. 

Some commentators have criticised the architecture, but others believe it creates a space for music that reflects the current internet age.  Outernet London have said they will preserve the area's musical legacy and support both music shops and live music. The redeveloped Denmark Street features busking points and a pro-bono recording studio in partnership with the BPI. Although some of the street still has scaffolding, Denmark Street appears largely unchanged with more music shops than ever and a new indie music venue called The Lower Third located on the site of the old 12 Bar Club.

References

External links 
Outernet London Website

London
privately owned public spaces
Redevelopment projects in London